John Keith Ewers (13 June 19049 March 1978) was a novelist, poet, schoolteacher and short story writer from Western Australia.
He was the second son of Ernest Ewers, orchardist, and his wife Annie Eliza, née Gray. When he was 6 years old, his mother died. Ewers was educated at James Street Intermediate and Perth Modern schools, and at Claremont Teachers College. He began writing while he was a young teacher. The Australian Journal published in 1924 was his first short story, under the nom-de-plume,  Waterjugs, a play on the meaning of ewer. He wrote early on in his career in Our Rural Magazine and Walkabout.

Ewers was involved in the Western Australian branch of the Fellowship of Australian Writers and was its president. He campaigned to preserve "Tom Collins" House (the home of Joseph Furphy, author of Such is Life), in the Perth suburb of Swanbourne.

He also co-authored, with Deirdre Ellis Weston, the following grammar textbooks that were used widely throughout Western Australian schools during the 1950s to 1970s.

In June 1936 Ewers married school teacher and University of Western Australia scientist Jean Grant McIntyre. They had one child, Trisha Kotai-Ewers born in 1939.

Works
 Money street : a novel (London, 1933)
 The story of the pipe-line: being an account of the construction of the Coolgardie water scheme with some chapters on the early history of Western Australia (Perth, 1935)
 Fire on the Wind (London, 1935, Hodder & Stoughton)
 Tell the people!: an explanation of the little-known writings of Joseph Furphy (Tom Collins) in the light of their value for Australia to-day (Sydney, 1943)
 Tales from the Dead Heart (Sydney, 1944)
 Men Against the Earth (Melbourne, 1946)
 Perth Boys' School, 1847-1947: the story of the first hundred years of a great school, with a background of the history of education in Western Australia (Perth,  1947)
 For Heroes to Live In (Melbourne, 1948)
 Harvest and Other Stories (Sydney, 1949) 
 With the Sun on My Back (Angus & Robertson, Sydney, 1953)
 Who Rides on the River? (Sydney, 1956) 
 Bruce Rock (1959)
 The western gateway: a history of Fremantle (Nedlands, 1971.2nd rev. ed.)
 I came naked : a selection of verse 1970-1975  (Black Rock, Vic. 1976.)
 Long enough for a joke: an autobiography (Fremantle Arts Centre Press, 1983)
With Deirdre Ellis Weston:

References

1904 births
1978 deaths
20th-century Australian novelists
Australian male novelists
People educated at Perth Modern School
Writers from Western Australia
Australian male short story writers
20th-century Australian poets
Australian male poets
20th-century Australian short story writers
20th-century Australian male writers